is a Concours d'Elegance event in Italy for classic and vintage cars. It takes place annually near the Villa d'Este hotel in Cernobbio, on the western shore of Lake Como in northern Italy. Since 2011, the event has taken place in the second half of May.

BMW Group has organised the event, jointly with the Villa d'Este hotel, for the last ten years. Visitors can admire about fifty cars, all built between the 1920s and the 1970s, organized in different categories.

Car makers also take advantage of the event to showcase some of their upcoming models. For example, a working Aston Martin One-77 was officially unveiled to the press during the 2009 event.

List of Winners

Winners

2022 Event
Cernobbio, 20–22 May 2022

2021 Event
Cernobbio, 1–3 October 2021

Historic cars
 Coppa d’Oro Villa d’Este - Best of Show (by Public Referendum at Villa d’Este):
Lancia Dilambda Serie I 227 Carlton Carriage, 1930
 Trofeo BMW Group - Best of Show (by the Jury):
Ferrari 250 GT TDF (Tour de France), 1956
 Trofeo BMW Group Italia - (by Public Referendum at Villa Erba):
Fiat 508 CS “Balilla Aerodinamica”, 1935

Concept cars and prototypes
Concorso d’Eleganza Design Award (By Public Referendum at Villa Erba):  
Automobili Pininfarina Battista, 2019

2020 Event
Event canceled due to COVID-19 pandemic

2019 Event
Cernobbio, 24–26 May 2019

Historic cars
 Coppa d’Oro Villa d’Este - Best of Show (by Public Referendum at Villa d’Este):
Alfa Romeo, 8C 2900B, Berlinetta, Touring , 1937
 Trofeo BMW Group - Best of Show (by the Jury):
Alfa Romeo, 8C 2900B, Berlinetta, Touring , 1937
 Trofeo BMW Group Italia - (by Public Referendum at Villa Erba):
Lancia Astura Serie IV, Cabriolet, Pinin Farina, 1938

Concept cars and prototypes
Concorso d’Eleganza Design Award (By Public Referendum at Villa Erba):  
Bugatti La Voiture Noire,  Coupé 2019

2018 Event
Cernobbio, 25–27 May 2018

Historic cars

Concept cars and prototypes

2017 Event
Cernobbio, 26–28 May 2017

Historic cars

Concept cars and prototypes
Renault Trezor

2016 Event
Cernobbio, 20–22 May 2016

Historic cars

Concept cars and prototypes

2015 Event
Cernobbio, 22–24 May 2015

Historic cars
 Coppa d’Oro Villa d’Este - Best of Show (by Public Referendum at Villa d’Este):
Ferrari 166 MM, Barchetta 1950
 Trofeo BMW Group - Best of Show (by the Jury):
Alfa Romeo 8C 2300,  Spider 1932
 Trofeo BMW Group Italia - (by Public Referendum at Villa Erba):
Ferrari 166 MM, Barchetta 1950

Concept cars and prototypes
Concorso d’Eleganza Design Award (By Public Referendum at Villa Erba):  
Bentley EXP 10 Speed Six,  Coupé 2015

2014 Event
Cernobbio, 23–25 May 2014

Historic cars
 Coppa d’Oro Villa d’Este - Best of Show (by Public Referendum at Villa d’Este):
Alfa Romeo 6C 1750 GS, Spider, 1931
 Trofeo BMW Group - Best of Show (by the Jury):
Maserati 450 S, Roadster 1956
 Trofeo BMW Group Italia - (by Public Referendum at Villa Erba):
Alfa Romeo 6C 1750 GS, Spider, 1931

Concept cars and prototypes

Concorso d’Eleganza Design Award (By Public Referendum at Villa Erba):  
Maserati Alfieri, Coupé 2014

2013 Event
Cernobbio, 24–26 May 2013

Historic cars
 Coppa d’Oro Villa d’Este - Best of Show (by Public Referendum at Villa d’Este):
Bugatti 57SC Atlantic, Jean Bugatti, 1938
 Trofeo BMW Group - Best of Show (by the Jury):
Bugatti 57SC Atlantic, Jean Bugatti, 1938
 Trofeo BMW Group Italia - (by Public Referendum at Villa Erba):
Bugatti 57SC Atlantic, Jean Bugatti, 1938

Concept cars and prototypes
Concorso d’Eleganza Design Award (By Public Referendum at Villa Erba):  
Alfa Romeo Disco Volante Touring Superleggera, Coupé 2013

2012 Event

Historic Cars

 Coppa d’Oro Villa d’Este Alfa Romeo 6C 1750 GS 6th Series, 1933 (by the Jury and by Public Referendum at Villa d’Este) and winner of BMW Group Trophy.

Concept Cars & Prototypes

Concorso d’Eleganza Design Award: Alfa Romeo 4C, 2011

2011 Event

Historic Cars

Alfa Romeo 33 Stradale, Berlinetta, Scaglione, 1968 (by the Jury and by Public Referendum at Villa Erba) and Alfa Romeo 6C 2500 SS, Coupé, Bertone, 1942 (by Public Referendum at Villa d’Este)

Concept Cars & Prototypes

Concorso d’Eleganza Design Award (By Public Referendum at Villa Erba):  
Aston Martin V12 Zagato, Coupé, 2011

2010 Event
Cernobbio, 23–25 April 2010

Historic Cars

 Coppa d’Oro Villa d’Este - Best of Show (by Public Referendum at Villa d’Este):
Maserati A6GCS, Spider, Frua, 1955
 Trofeo BMW Group - Best of Show (by the Jury):
Talbot-Lago T150 C SS Teardrop, Coupé, Figoni & Falaschi, 1938
 Trofeo BMW Group Italia - (by Public Referendum at Villa Erba):
Talbot-Lago T150 C SS Teardrop, Coupé, Figoni & Falaschi, 1938

Concept Cars & Prototypes

Concorso d’Eleganza Design Award (By Public Referendum at Villa Erba):  
Zagato Alfa Romeo TZ3 Corsa, Coupé, 2010

2009 Event
Cernobbio, 24–26 April 2009

Historic Cars

 Coppa d’Oro Villa d’Este (80th anniversary) - Best of Show (by Public Referendum at Villa d’Este):
Alfa Romeo 8C 2900B, Berlinetta Touring, 1938.
 Trofeo BMW Group - Best of Show (by the Jury):
Alfa Romeo 8C 2900B, Berlinetta Touring, 1938.
 Trofeo BMW Group Italia - (by Public Referendum at Villa Erba):
Alfa Romeo 8C 2900B, Berlinetta Touring, 1938.

Concept Cars & Prototypes

Concorso d’Eleganza Design Award (By Public Referendum at Villa Erba):  
Aston Martin Lagonda One-77, Coupé, 2009

2008 Event
Cernobbio, 26–27 April 2008

Historic Cars

 Coppa d’Oro Villa d’Este - Best of Show (by Public Referendum at Villa d’Este):
Mercedes-Benz 540K Autobahnkurier Coupé, 1938
 Trofeo BMW Group - Best of Show (by the Jury):
Ferrari 166 MM Berlinetta Touring, 1949
 Trofeo BMW Group Italia - (by Public Referendum at Villa Erba):
Delahaye 135M 2-seater roadster Figoni & Falaschi, 1937

Concept Cars & Prototypes

Concorso d’Eleganza Design Award (By Public Referendum at Villa Erba):  
Bugatti Veyron Fbg Hermès, 2008

References

External links

Official website

Automotive events
Concours d'Elegance
Auto shows in Italy
1929 establishments in Italy
Recurring events established in 1929
Cernobbio